architectsAlliance is a Toronto-based architectural firm headed by architect Peter Clewes. It was formed in 1999 with the merger of Wallman Clewes Bergman (composed of Rudy Wallman, Peter Clewes and Ralph Bergman) and Van Nostrand DiCastri Architects.

Their projects include 18 Yorkville, Pier 27, Radio City, Murano, Burano, X the Condominium, MoZo, Twenty Niagara, District Lofts, Tip Top Lofts.

The Four Seasons Hotel and Residences in Toronto and an upcoming project in the Bahamas named 12 Mile Cay are significant current projects. In 2005, the firm won the Regent Park housing competition held by the Toronto Community Housing Corporation, in the redevelopment of a  social housing community east of downtown Toronto.

See also
Peter Clewes

References

External links
Official site

Architecture firms of Canada
Companies based in Toronto